War Memorial Park is a public park in West Bridgewater, Massachusetts.  It is located south of the town center, bounded by River Street, Arch Street and the Town River.  The park was established in the 1930s and was constructed in part with funding from the Works Progress Administration.  The park is located at the site of West Bridgewater's earliest industrial activities, a mill site dating to the 17th century.  This early use spawned a variety of other water-powered industrial uses in the 18th and 19th centuries, and was notably the site of Ames Shovel Company's first factory.  The 1936 creation of the park resulted in the donation of a large number of historic industrial artifacts, which are displayed on its grounds.

The park was listed on the National Register of Historic Places in 2008.

See also
National Register of Historic Places listings in Plymouth County, Massachusetts

References

National Register of Historic Places in Plymouth County, Massachusetts
Parks in Plymouth County, Massachusetts